The East Lancashire derby, also known as the Cotton Mills derby and El Lanclasico, is an association football rivalry between Blackburn Rovers and Burnley. The nickname originates from the fact that both Blackburn and Burnley are former mill towns. From a town standpoint there is a geographical reason for the rivalry as the two Lancashire towns only lie 11 miles (18 km) apart. Accrington Stanley F.C. is based in the middle, but is not regarded as a rival by either.

Following the founding of Turton F.C. in Edgworth in 1871, several football clubs were formed in East Lancashire in the next years, such as Blackburn Rovers in 1875, Accrington in 1876 and Burnley in 1882. Rovers and Burnley played each other for the first time in September 1884 in a friendly match, with Blackburn winning 4–2. Between 1884 and 1888, the clubs met thirteen times, with Burnley winning seven matches and Rovers four. The first competitive league game between these two founder members of the Football League and former English football champions, took place at Turf Moor in November 1888, with Blackburn winning 7–1, their biggest win in the derby. Burnley's largest derby victory is a 6–0 win recorded in April 1896.

Burnley hold the better head-to-head record, as the side have won 43 games to Blackburn's 41 in major competitions. Including matches played in regional competitions such as the Lancashire Cup, Burnley have won 69 games to Blackburn's 65.

History
Burnley and Blackburn Rovers met for the first time on 27 September 1884. The match was played at Burnley's home ground, Turf Moor, in front of a 5,000 crowd, with Blackburn emerging as 4–2 winners. Burnley quickly gained revenge when they won 5–1 at the same ground in March 1885. Their first meeting in Blackburn took place at Leamington Road and ended 2–2. In total, the clubs met thirteen times between 1884 and 1888, Burnley winning seven games and Blackburn four.

Blackburn Rovers and Burnley were among the 12 founder members of the Football league and took their places in the inaugural season, which was dominated by fellow Lancashire side Preston North End. The first league match between Rovers and Burnley was at Turf Moor and resulted in a 7–1 win for Blackburn. Rovers won the next season the home fixture by the same margin; Burnley remain the only team Blackburn have beaten home and away by this score line to this day. Over the first four seasons, before the league was split into two divisions, Blackburn performed the double over Burnley in each of the initial three seasons. In this period, striker Jack Southworth scored 12 goals in 10 appearances against Burnley, including Rovers' first ever league hat-trick.

Burnley recorded their first league victory over Rovers in December 1891, albeit in heavy snowy conditions and controversial circumstances. Burnley were 3–0 up at half-time at Turf Moor. After the interval, Lofthouse was sent off along with Burnley's Alec Stewart after a brief altercation, and the rest of the Rovers outfield players went with him. Only Blackburn's goalkeeper, Herbie Arthur, stayed on the pitch. Arthur appealed for offside as Burnley bore down on his goal. The referee quickly abandoned the game and the points were awarded to Burnley.

Rovers continued to have the better of the fixture, registering five consecutive wins at home ground Ewood Park between 1892 and 1897, although Burnley recorded their largest victory against Blackburn in 1895–96, when they beat Rovers 6–0 with Tom Nicol scoring a hat-trick. The clubs were temporarily parted by Burnley's relegation in 1896–97, which was assisted by Rovers completing the double over them. In March 1913, the sides met each other for the first time in the FA Cup, with Burnley winning 1–0 at Ewood Park in front of almost 43,000 spectators, including 22,000 Burnley fans.

After the First World War ended, Blackburn and Burnley played each other for 11 uninterrupted years in the top flight. Burnley experienced initial dominance, winning their first First Division title in 1920–21 and doing the double over Rovers. The mid-1920s saw three hat-tricks in two seasons by Blackburn players in the fixture, from Johnny McIntyre, Arthur Rigby and Ted Harper. Burnley were relegated to the Second Division in 1929–30. The two clubs would not meet again until Blackburn joined them in the second tier in 1935–36.

The first fixture in the Second Division ended in a goalless draw. Rovers won the return fixture 3–1, Jack Bruton scoring against his former club and again the following season. Bruton remains the only man to have scored for both clubs against the other, also having netted twice for Burnley against Rovers in the 1920s. Blackburn won the Second Division title in 1938–39, after which football was suspended during the Second World War. Burnley won promotion when the league was restarted in 1946–47 and also reached the 1947 FA Cup final. Burnley took three of the four points against Blackburn and finished third in 1947–48, while Rovers were relegated.

Blackburn returned to the top flight in 1957–58, where they would stay until 1966. Burnley won their second First Division title in 1959–60, and between 1958 and 1966, they won eight of the sixteen league meetings against Blackburn, including four successive wins at Ewood Park. Both clubs were relegated in 1970–71; Burnley went down to the second tier, while Blackburn were relegated to the third tier. Burnley returned to the First Division two years later but upon relegation in 1975–76, they rejoined Rovers who had been promoted from the Third Division in 1974–75. Burnley again had the edge in the fixture, winning four of the six matches, with midfielder Peter Noble scoring in four of the games. Rovers went down again at the end of the 1978–79 season, but bounced straight back while Burnley moved into the opposite direction entering the Third Division for the first time at the end of 1979–80. Burnley won promotion in 1981–82 to set up a renewal of the fixture. The games in 1982–83 were both won by Rovers and would ultimately prove to be the last between them in the 20th century. Simon Garner scored all three Blackburn goals in the two games, two of which came from the penalty spot.

In the following 27 years both clubs had very different fortunes. Burnley were again relegated to the Third Division at the end of the 1982–83 season, which was quickly followed by relegation to the Fourth Division in the 1984–85 season. Both clubs would stay in their respective divisions until 1991–92, when Blackburn were promoted to the newly formed Premier League and Burnley were promoted to the third tier. Burnley were promoted to the second tier in 1993–94 but were relegated the following year, while Blackburn won the Premier League title, having been bankrolled by local businessman Jack Walker.

Blackburn became the first and only Premier League winners to be relegated, in 1998–99, and were joined in the second tier by Burnley, who won promotion from the third tier at the end of the 1999–2000 season. The first meeting of the new millennium between them was at Turf Moor in December 2000. Rovers won 2–0, while Burnley's Kevin Ball was sent off. Blackburn also won the return fixture at Ewood Park with a scoreline of 5–0 and were promoted back to the Premier League at the end of the season.

Burnley won the Championship play-off in 2009 and were promoted to the Premier League for the first time, which also meant that the fixture would be played in the top division for the first time since January 1966. For the trip to Ewood Park, Burnley and Blackburn fans were forced to travel on designated buses. Blackburn won the first match at home, while the police made a total of 55 arrests as violence erupted inside and outside a local pub, who described the violence as one of the worst cases they had ever seen. In the buildup to the return fixture at Turf Moor, Blackburn player David Dunn said in the local newspaper that he hopes "Rovers thump Burnley 10–0", by then going on to say "I hope they stay up". Blackburn completed the double over their rivals later that season, with David Dunn scoring the only goal from the penalty spot after a dive from Martin Olsson. After the game, 150 seats in the away end were ripped up and the sinks in the toilets were smashed, with 42 arrests made involving both fan groups. Burnley were relegated at the end of the season, while Blackburn were relegated to the second tier at the end of 2011–12.

After the following three matches in the Football League Championship between both sides ended in draws, Burnley defeated Blackburn for the first time in 35 years in March 2014. At Ewood Park, Blackburn went 1–0 up but Burnley scored twice in the closing stages. Burnley were promoted to the Premier League at the end of the 2013–14 season but went down the following year. Burnley did the double over Rovers on their return to the second tier and also won the first ever League Cup meeting between both teams in 2017.

List of derbies 

Note: excluding games played during the First and Second World Wars

Head-to-head 

Source:

Regional competitions 

Note: excluding games played during the First and Second World Wars
Note: teams have fielded their reserve teams in the Lancashire Cup since the mid-1990s

Head-to-head 

Source:

Total head-to-head

Honours 

Source:

Crossing the divide
Jack Bruton is the only man to score for both sides against the other. At Burnley, he scored 44 goals in 176 matches before Rovers broke their transfer record by paying £6,500 in 1929. Bruton would make 344 appearances for Blackburn, scoring 115 goals and also managed the club for a short period in the late 1940s.

In the 1950s and 1960s, a few Burnley players moved to Blackburn Rovers. These included goalkeeper Adam Blacklaw, defender Walter Joyce and winger John Connelly. Blacklaw, a Scottish international, played 374 matches for Burnley and 110 games for Rovers. Connelly won the First Division with Burnley in 1960 and moved to Manchester United in 1964. He scored 103 goals in 260 matches for Burnley, including five against Blackburn. Connelly made 20 appearances for the England national team and was a member of their World Cup squad in 1966. After the tournament, he moved to Blackburn, where he played 110 games.

Full-back Keith Newton, a youth product of Blackburn Rovers, played 357 times for the side before he joined Everton in 1969. After three years, he switched to Burnley in 1972 and won promotion to the top flight with the club in 1973. He played a combined record number of 593 occasions for Blackburn and Burnley in the league and cup. Another full-back to make the move from Turf Moor to Ewood Park via another club, Leeds United, was Kevin Hird. Converted to a midfielder at Burnley, Hird – a lifelong Burnley supporter – netted for Rovers against Burnley on Boxing Day in 1978.

In the early 2000s, two Blackburn players had loan spells at Burnley, these being Jay McEveley and Andy Todd. David May, who played for Blackburn between 1988 and 1994, captained Burnley in his only season there in 2003–04. Another ex-Blackburn player, Alan Mahon, joined Burnley in 2006, although he had a spell at Wigan Athletic in between. Mahon's Blackburn debut had come as a substitute against Burnley at Turf Moor in December 2000. Andy Cole, who signed for Rovers for a then club-record £8 million in 2001, spent six months on loan from Sunderland at Burnley towards the end of his career in 2008.

In 2016, Owen Coyle became the new manager of Blackburn Rovers and became the first person to manage Blackburn and Burnley, where he was appointed from 2007 to 2010.

Pranks
In the 1990–91 season, Burnley were eliminated by Torquay United in the Fourth Division play-off semi-final. After the match, a plane flew over Turf Moor with a banner saying "Staying down forever luv Rovers Ha Ha Ha". This prank has largely been attributed to former Blackburn striker Simon Garner, although he denies this, but does claim to know who was responsible. The Burnley fans gained some revenge in 1994, after Blackburn Rovers were beaten by Swedish semi-professional team Trelleborgs FF in the UEFA Cup. The Burnley supporters changed a road sign to 'twin' Burnley with Trelleborg.

For the match at Burnley during the 2009–10 season, Blackburn Rovers fans wore Owen Coyle masks to wind the Burnley fans up as Coyle had left Burnley for Bolton Wanderers. In the lead up to the return fixture in March 2010, the police allegedly foiled a plot by Burnley fans to paint Blackburn midfielder David Dunn's house claret and blue. In May 2012, during Blackburn's home game against Wigan Athletic, Burnley supporters arranged a plane to fly over Ewood Park which read — In Venky's we trust-Burnley SU. Rovers lost the fixture 1–0 and were subsequently relegated from the Premier League. In 2014, at a Championship fixture at Ewood Park, Burnley beat their rivals for the first time in 35 years. Forty minutes into the first half, a plane flew overhead with a banner that read: "35yrs who cares? Venkys 4ever".

In 2015, a sponge inside a Blackburn Rovers birthday cake was found to bear the colours of Burnley; it was discovered that the maker was a Burnley fan. The prank received further coverage on an episode of Judge Rinder, with the Blackburn supporter losing the case for compensation.

References

England football derbies
Blackburn Rovers F.C.
Burnley F.C.